Monty Python's Tiny Black Round Thing was a 33 rpm flexidisc by Monty Python, released to promote the original release of Monty Python Live at Drury Lane. 400,000 copies were given away free with the British music weekly paper NME (New Musical Express) during May 1974.

The release contained two live tracks which would appear on the team's forthcoming Drury Lane LP, although "Election Night Special" is a longer edit than which would feature on the album.

Michael Palin provided new linking material, with his performance as the Head of NME sounding a very close relation to Mr Gumby.

In 2014 the record was reissued on heavyweight 45 rpm vinyl as part of Monty Python's Total Rubbish.

Track listing

Side One
 Introduction from Head of New Musical Express (0:55)
 Election Night Special Part 1(6:38)
 Hair Spray Ad (0:51)

Side Two
 Reviews (0:59)
 Election Night Special Part 2/The Lumberjack Song (5:03)

References

Monty Python
1974 singles
Flexi discs
Charisma Records singles